Events from the year 1336 in Ireland.

Incumbent
Lord: Edward III

Events

 3 May – ordinances for reform of Irish administration
 after 26 May – Conchobhar mac Tomaltach Mac Diarmada succeeds his father as lord of Moylurg
 22–23 June – Brian Ban of Thomond burns Tipperary town; Justicier Darcy leads a campaign against him
 1 July – prohibition against holding of lands by officials in areas where they hold office
 Castlemore Costello in (County Mayo) destroyed by King Toirdhealbhach of Connacht
 The Franciscan order establishes in Carrick on Suir with the granting of land for a friary by the 1st Earl of Ormond
 Surviving portions of the Annals of Nenagh begin

Births

Deaths

 c.26 May Tomaltach Mac Diarmada, lord of Moylurg

References

"The Annals of Ireland by Friar John Clyn", edited and translated with an Introduction, by Bernadette Williams, Four Courts Press, 2007. , pp. 240–244.
"A New History of Ireland VIII: A Chronology of Irish History to 1976", edited by T. W. Moody, F.X. Martin and F.J. Byrne. Oxford, 1982. .
http://www.ucc.ie/celt/published/T100001B/index.html
http://www.ucc.ie/celt/published/T100005C/index.html
http://www.ucc.ie/celt/published/T100010B/index.html

 
1330s in Ireland
Ireland
Years of the 14th century in Ireland